The Simborio is a dome-shaped structure at the center of Sta. Ana Cemetery in Taguig in the Philippines. It was built by the Filipinos during the 18th century through the supervision of Spanish Friars.

Architecture
The dome's walls were made of stone and its diameter measures 12 meters. A small cross is situated on top of the dome. It has an 11-step stairway with rails on the left and right side leading up to an arched entrance door which is made of welded iron. A narrow patio surrounds the entire dome. Inside it, a small altar is found.

There are only two windows, both with iron vertical bars. Stacked tombs of up to three levels high are situated below the dome.

Renovations and present situation
Some minor renovations were done to the Simborio in 1980 and 1993. At present, the dome is used as storage of construction materials. Plants continue to sprout in the stone walls, covering the left part of the dome and roots are visibly attached to the walls inside the dome. Vandalism is manifested in both its interior and exterior walls.

Gallery

See also
 Saint Anne Parish Church (Taguig)

References

Spanish Colonial architecture in the Philippines
Buildings and structures in Taguig